The following page lists electric utilities in the United States.

Largest utilities by revenue (2022) 

Reference:

List of US electric companies by state

Alabama

 Alabama Municipal Electric Authority
 Albertville Municipal Utilities Board 
 Arab Electric Cooperative, Inc.
 Alabama Power, a part of the Southern Company
 Athens Utilities, Athens, Limestone County
 Cherokee Electric Cooperative
 Cullman Electric Cooperative, Cullman city and county, Touchstone Energy
 Utilities Board of the City of Cullman
 Decatur Utilities,  Municipal Utilities Board of Decatur, Morgan County, Alabama
 Florence Utilities, City of Florence, Lauderdale County
 Franklin Electric Cooperatives, Franklin, Colbert and Lawrence Counties in northwest Alabama
 Guntersville Electric Board
 Huntsville UtilitiesCity of Huntsville, Madison County
 Joe Wheeler Electric Member Cooperative – Morgan, Lawrence counties, part of Touchstone Energy Cooperatives
 Marshall-DeKalb Electric Cooperative
 PowerSouth
 Sand Mountain Electric Cooperative DeKalb, Jackson, Marshall and Cherokee counties
 Scottsboro Electric Power Board
 Tennessee Valley Authority
 Tombigbee Electric Cooperative HQ and service in Hamilton, and Marion County Alabama, with service also in Mississippi
 Wiregrass Electric Cooperative

Alaska
 Alaska Electric Light & Power
MHI ELECTRIC DISTRIBUTION
Copper Valley Electric Association
Golden Valley Electric Association
Kodiak Electric Association
Municipal Light & Power

Arizona
 Arizona Public Service
 Salt River Project
 Tucson Electric Power
 UniSource Energy Services
 Page Power and Water

Arkansas
 Southwestern Electric Power Company
 Entergy Arkansas, Inc.
 Associated Electrical Cooperative Incorporated

California 
Alameda Municipal Power
Anaheim Public Utilities
Azusa Light & Water
Burbank Water & Power
Direct Energy
East Bay Municipal Utility District
Glendale Public Service Department
Gridley Municipal Utilities
Healdsburg Municipal Electric Department
Imperial Irrigation District
Island Energy
Modesto Irrigation District
Los Angeles Department of Water and Power
MAD DEAN ELECTRIC COMPANY
O'Brien Cogeneration
Pacific Gas and Electric
Pasadena Water & Power
 PacifiCorp (Pacific Power)
Riverside Public Utilities
Sacramento Municipal Utility District
 San Diego Gas & Electric
San Francisco Public Utilities Commission
Santa Clara Electric Department
Sierra-Pacific Power
Southern California Edison
Southern California Public Power Authority
TID Water & Power - Turlock Irrigation District

Colorado
 Public Service Company of Colorado, a subsidiary of Xcel Energy
 Intermountain Rural Electrical Association
 Colorado Springs Utilities
 Platte River Power Authority
 United Power, Inc.
Tri-State Generation and Transmission Association (A cooperative of Touchstone )
Poudre Valley Rual Electric Association  (Cooperative of Touchstone Energy)
La Plata Electric Association (A cooperative of Touchstone Energy)
Western Area Power Administration
 City of Fountain Electric

Connecticut
 AVANGRID (The United Illuminating Company)
 Direct Energy
 Connecticut Light and Power (Eversource Energy)
 Northeast Utilities

Delaware
 Ambit Energy
 City of Dover Electric Department 
 City of Milford Electric Department 
 City of Newark Electric Department 
 WAPDA
 City of Seaford Electric Department 
 Delaware Electric Cooperative
 Delaware Municipal Electric Corporation
 Delmarva Power, a subsidiary of Exelon
 Lewes Board of Public Works 
 Municipal Services Commission of the City of New Castle 
 Town of Clayton Electric Department 
 Town of Middletown Electric Department 
 Town of Smyrna Electric Department 
 Direct Energy

District of Columbia
 PEPCO, a subsidiary of Exelon
 Direct Energy

Florida

 Beaches Energy Services
 Central Florida Electric Cooperative
 Choctawhatchee Electric Cooperative
 City of Alachua Public Services Department
 City of Bartow Electric Department
 City of Blountstown Electric Department
 City of Bushnell Utilities Department
 City of Chattahoochee Electric Department
 City of Fort Meade Utilities Department
 City of Green Cove Springs Utilities Department
 City of Lake Worth Utilities Department
 City of Moore Haven Utilities Department
 City of Mount Dora Electric Utility
 City of New Smyrna Beach Utilities Commission
 City of Newberry Electric Utility
 City of Quincy Utilities Department
 City of Starke Utilities Department
 City of Tallahassee Utilities
 City of Vero Beach Electric Utilities
 City of Wachula Utilities
 City of Williston Utilities Department
 City of Winter Park Electric Utility Department
 Clay Electric Cooperative
 Clewiston Utilities
 Duke Energy Florida, a part of Duke Energy
 Escambia River Electric Cooperative
 Florida Keys Electric Cooperative
 Florida Municipal Power Agency
 Florida Power & Light, a part of NextEra Energy
 Florida Public Utilities, a part of Chesapeake Utilities
 Fort Pierce Utilities Authority
 Gainesville Regional Utilities
 Glades Electric Cooperative
 Gulf Coast Electric Cooperative
 Gulf Power Company, a part of NextEra Energy
 Homestead Public Services
 JEA
 Keys Energy Services
 Kissimmee Utility Authority
 Lakeland Electric
Lake Worth Utilities
 Lee County Electric Cooperative
 Leesburg Electric Department
 Ocala Electric Utility
 Okefenoke Rural Electric Membership Corporation
 Orlando Utilities Commission
Palm Peach
 Peace River Electric Cooperative
Progress Energy Florida
 PowerSouth Energy Cooperative
 Reedy Creek Energy Services
 St. Cloud Utilities
 Seminole Electric Cooperative
 Sumter Electric Cooperative
 Suwannee Valley Electric Cooperative
 Talquin Electric Cooperative
 TECO Energy, a part of Emera
 Town of Havana Utilities
 Tri-County Electric Cooperative
 West Florida Electric Cooperative
 Withlacoochee River Electric Cooperative

Georgia
 Georgia Power, a part of the Southern Company
 Municipal Electric Authority of Georgia (MEAG Power)
 Oglethorpe Power
 BSDK Power
 Tennessee Valley Authority
 Altamaha EMC
 Amicalola EMC
 Abla espanol Electric
 Blue Ridge Mountain EMC
 Canoochee EMC
 Carroll EMC
 Central Georgia EMC
 Coastal Electric Cooperative
 Cobb EMC
 Colquitt EMC
 Coweta-Fayette EMC
 Diverse Power Inc.
 Diverse Power Inc. - Pataula District
 Excelsior EMC
 Flint Energies
 Grady EMC
 GreyStone Power Corp.
 Habersham EMC
 Hart EMC
 Irwin EMC
 Jackson EMC
 Jefferson Energy Cooperative
 Little Ocmulgee EMC
 Marietta Power
 Middle Georgia EMC
 Mitchell EMC
 North Georgia EMC
 Ocmulgee EMC
 Oconee EMC
 Okefenoke REMC
 Planters EMC
 Rayle EMC
 Satilla REMC
 Sawnee EMC
 Slash Pine EMC
 Snapping Shoals EMC
 Southern Rivers Energy
 Sumter EMC
 Three Notch EMC
 Tri-County EMC
 Tri-State EMC
 Upson EMC
 Walton EMC
 Washington EMC
 Direct Energy

Hawaii
 Hawaiian Electric Company (HECO), Oʻahu subsidiary of Hawaiian Electric Industries
 Hawaiian Electric Light Company (HELCO), Island of Hawaiʻi subsidiary of Hawaiian Electric Industries
 Kauaʻi Island Utility Cooperative (KIUC)
 Maui Electric Company (MECO), Maui County subsidiary of Hawaiian Electric Industries

Idaho
 Avista
Clearwater Power
 IDACORP (Idaho Power)
 PacifiCorp (Rocky Mountain Power)

Illinois
 Ameren
 Illinois power
 Champion Energy
 City Water, Light & Power (Springfield, Illinois)
 ComEd, a subsidiary of Exelon
 Direct Energy
 Coles Moultrie Electric Cooperative
 Prairie State Generating Company
 Sullivan Electric Company

Indiana
 AES Indiana (formerly Indianapolis Power & Light)
 American Electric Power (Indiana Michigan Power)
 Cinergy Corporation
Duke Energy
 Indiana Municipal Power Agency
 NiSource
Northern Indiana Public Service Company
 Vectren (Southern Indiana Gas & Electric Company)

Iowa
 Interstate Power and Light Company, a part of Alliant Energy
 MidAmerican Energy

Kansas
 Kansas City Board of Public Utilities
 Evergy
 McPherson BPU

Kentucky
 American Electric Power
Cinergy Corporation
Direct Energy
 Duke Energy
 Kentucky Utilities
 Louisville Gas & Electric
Owensboro Municipal Utilities
 Tennessee Valley Authority

Louisiana
 CLECO
 Entergy
 SWEPCO, a subsidiary of American Electric Power
 SLEMCO

Maine
AVANGRID (Central Maine Power)
 Direct Energy
Versant Power, a part of ENMAX

Maryland
 A&N Electric Cooperative
 Agway Energy Services
Allegheny Electric Cooperative
 Ambit Energy
Baltimore Gas and Electric, a subsidiary of Exelon
 Berlin Electric Utility Department
 Champion Energy
 Choptank Electric Cooperative
Conectiv, a subsidiary of PEPCO which is a subsidiary of Exelon
Delmarva Power, a subsidiary of Exelon
 Direct Energy
 Easton Utilities
 FirstEnergy (Potomac Edison)
 Hagerstown Light Department
 Just Energy
 Southern Maryland Electric Cooperative (SMECO)
 Town of Thurmont Municipal Light Company
 Town of Williamsport Utilities

Massachusetts
 Ashburnham Municipal Light
 Belmont Municipal Light
Berkshire Company (WMECO)
 Braintree Electric Light Department
 Boylston Electric Light Department
 Chester Municipal Electric Light
 Chicopee Electric Light Department
 Concord Municipal Light Plant
 Danvers Electric Department
 Eversource Energy (NSTAR, Western Massachusetts Electric)
 Georgetown Electric Department
 Gosnold Municipal Electric Plant
 Groton Electric Department
 Groveland Light Department
 Hingham Municipal Light Department
 Holden Municipal Light Department
 Holyoke Gas and Electric
 Hudson Light and Water Department
 Hull Electric Light Department
 Ipswich Electric Light Department
 Littleton Electric Light and Water Department
 Marblehead Municipal Light Department
 Mansfield Municipal Light Department
 Merrimac Light and Water Department
 Middleboro Municipal Gas and Electric Department
 Middleton Municipal Light Department
National Grid (Massachusetts Electric, Nantucket Electric)
 North Attleboro Electric Department
Northeast Utilities
 Norwood Electric Light Department
NSTAR
 Paxton Municipal Light Department
 Peabody Municipal Light Plant
 Princeton Electric Light Department
 Reading Municipal Light Department
 Rowley Electric Light Department
 Russell Municipal Light Department
 Shrewsbury Electric Light Department
 South Hadley Electric Light Department
 Sterling Electric Light Department
 Taunton Municipal Light Plant
 Templeton Municipal Light Company
 Unitil Corporation
 Wakefield Municipal Gas and Light Department
 Wellesley Municipal Light Plant
 West Boylston Municipal Lighting
 Westfield Gas and Electric Department
 PTI Electric Department
 Direct Energy

Michigan
Alger Delta Electric Cooperative
Alpena Power Company
American Electric Power (Indiana Michigan Power)
Cherryland Electric Cooperative
Cloverland Electric Cooperative (Cloverland acquired Edison Sault Electric Company in 2009)
Consumers Energy
 DTE Energy (DTE Energy Electric Company)
Great Lakes Energy Cooperative
Holland Board of Public Works
Homeworks Tri-County Electric Cooperative
 Lansing Board of Water & Light
Lowell Light and Power
Midwest Energy & Communications (Cooperative)
Ontonagon County REA (Cooperative)
Presque Isle Electric & Gas Cooperative
Thumb Electric Cooperative
 Upper Peninsula Power Company
 We Energies
 Wyandotte Municipal Services

Minnesota
Basin Electric Power Cooperative
Dairyland Power Coop
East River Electric Power Co-op
Freeborn-Mower Co-op Services
 Great River Energy, and its 28 member cooperatives
 Hutchinson Utilities Commission
Interstate Power and Light Company
L&O Power Co-op
Marshall Municipal Utilities
Minnkota Power Cooperative, and its 11 member cooperatives
 Minnesota Power
Missouri River Energy
Northern States Power Company, a subsidiary of Xcel Energy
People's Co-op Tri-County Electric
 Otter Tail Power Company
Rochester Public Utilities Commission
Southern Minnesota Municipal Power Agency
Willmar Municipal Utilities
Xcel Energy

Mississippi
 Entergy Mississippi
Magnolia Electric Power
 Mississippi Power, a part of the Southern Company
 Cooperative Energy, formerly South Mississippi Electric Power Association
 Tennessee Valley Authority
 Pearl River Valley EPA
Yazoo Valley Electric Power Association
http://coastepa.com

Missouri
 Ameren
Aquila
 Black River Electric Cooperative
 City Utilities of Springfield
 Hannibal, Missouri
 Citizens Electric Corporation
 Empire District Electric Company
Independence Power and Light
 Intercounty Electric Cooperative Association
 Kansas City Power and Light Company
 Laclede Electric Cooperative
 Macon Electric Cooperative
 Missouri Rural Electric Cooperative
 North Central Missouri Electric Cooperative
 Howell-Oregon Electric Cooperative
 Ozark Border Electric Cooperative
 Semo Electric Cooperative
 Sa-Ma-No Electric Cooperative
 White River Valley Electric Cooperative

Montana
 Central Montana Electric Power Cooperative
Montana-Dakota Utilities (MDU)
Montana Electric Cooperatives' Association
 Northwestern Energy

Nebraska
 Nebraska Public Power District
 Omaha Public Power District
 Lincoln Electric System
Western Area Power Administration

Nevada
 NV Energy (Nevada Power)
 NextEra (Valley Electric Association)
 Wells Rural Electric Company
 Boulder City Electric Utility
 Harney Electric Cooperative
 Lincoln County Power
 Mt Wheeler Power
 Overton Power
 Plumas Sierra Electric Cooperative
 Surprise Valley Electric Cooperative

New Hampshire
 Eversource Energy (Public Service Company of New Hampshire)
 Liberty Utilities (including Granite State Electric)
 New Hampshire Electric Cooperative
Northeast Utilities
National Grid
 Unitil Corporation

New Jersey
Investor-owned utilities
Atlantic City Electric, a subsidiary of Exelon
Jersey Central Power and Light Company, a subsidiary of FirstEnergy
Public Service Electric and Gas Company (PSE&G)
Rockland Electric, a subsidiary of Orange and Rockland, which is a subsidiary of Consolidated Edison
Municipal and cooperative utilities
Borough of Madison Electric Utility
Borough of Milltown Electric Department
Borough of Park Ridge Electric Department
Borough of Seaside Heights Electric Utility
Borough of South River Electric Department
Butler Power and Light
Lavallette Electric Department
Pemberton Borough Electric Department
Sussex Rural Electric Cooperative
Vineland Municipal Electric Utility

New Mexico
El Paso Electric
Public Service Company of New Mexico
 Southwestern Public Service Company, a subsidiary of Xcel Energy
Texas-New Mexico Power
Tri-State Generation and Transmission Association

New York
 Akron Municipal Electric Department
 Angelica Municipal Electric Department
Approved Energy
 Bath Municipal Electric Department
 Bergen Municipal Electric Department
 Boonville Municipal Electric Department
 Brocton Municipal Electric Department
 Castle Municipal Electric Department
Central Hudson Gas & Electric
CH Energy Group
 Churchville Municipal Electric Department
Consolidated Edison Company of New York, subsidiary of Consolidated Edison
Direct Energy
 East Coast Power & Gas
 Fishers Island Municipal Electric Department
 Frankfort Municipal Electric Department
 Freeport Electric Department
 Green Island Municipal Electric Department
 Greenport Municipal Electric Department
 Greene Municipal Electric Department
 Groton Municipal Electric Department
 Hamilton Municipal Electric Department
 Ilion Municipal Electric Department
 Jamestown Municipal Electric Department
 Lake Placid Municipal Electric Department
Long Island Power Authority (LIPA), operated by PSEG Long Island
 Marathon Municipal Electric Department
 Massena Electric Department
 Mayville Municipal Electric Department
National Grid (Niagara Mohawk)
 New York Power Authority (NYPA)
New York State Electric & Gas, subsidiary of AVANGRID
Orange and Rockland, which is a subsidiary of Consolidated Edison
 Penn Yan Municipal Electric Department
 Philadelphia Municipal Electric Department
 Plattsburgh Municipal Light Department
Northeast Utilities
Rochester Gas & Electric, subsidiary of AVANGRID
 Rockville Centre Municipal Electric Department
 Rouses Point Electric Department
 Salamanca Municipal Electric Department
 Sherburne Municipal Electric Department
 Sherrill Municipal Electric Department
 Skaneateles Municipal Electric Department
 Sliver Springs Municipal Electric Department
 Solvay Electric Department
 Spencerport Municipal Electric Department
 Springville Municipal Electric Department
 Theresa Municipal Electric Department
 Tupper Lake Municipal Electric Department
 Watkins Glen Municipal Electric Department
 Waverly Municipal Electric Department
 Wellsville Municipal Electric Department
 Westfield Municipal Electric Department

North Carolina
 Albemarle Electric Membership Corporation
 Blue Ridge Energy
 Brunswick Electric Membership Corporation
 Cape Hatteras Electric Cooperative 
 Carteret-Craven Electric Cooperative
 Central Electric Membership Corporation
 City of Concord Electric Department
 Dominion North Carolina Power
 Duke Energy
 Edgecombe-Martin County Electric Membership Corporation
 EnergyUnited
 Four County Electric Membership Corporation
 French Broad Electric Membership Corporation
 Halifax Electric Membership Corporation
 Haywood Electric Membership Corporation
 Jones-Onslow Electric Membership Corporation
 Lumbee River Electric Membership Corporation
 North Carolina Electric Membership Corporation
 Pee Dee Electric Membership Corporation
 Piedmont Electric Membership Corporation
 Pitt & Greene Electric Membership Corporation
 Randolph Electric Membership Corporation
 Roanoke Electric Cooperative
 Rutherford Electric Membership Corporation
 South River Electric Membership Corporation
 Surry-Yadkin Electric Membership Corporation
 Tennessee Valley Authority
 Tideland Electric Membership Corporation
 Tri-County Electric Membership Corporation
 Union Power Cooperative
 Wake Electric Membership Corporation

North Dakota
 Basin Electric Power Cooperative
 Central Power Electric Cooperative
 Montana Dakota Utilities (MDU)
 Minnkota Power Cooperative
 Northern States Power Company, a subsidiary of Xcel Energy
 Otter Tail Power Company
 Upper Missouri Power Cooperative (Upper Missouri G&T Cooperative)
Xcel Energy

Ohio
 American Electric Power
 Consolidated Electric Cooperative
 Dayton Power & Light
 Direct Energy
 Duke Energy
 FirstEnergy (Cleveland Electric Illuminating Company, Ohio Edison, Toledo Edison)
 South Central Power Company

Oklahoma
 East Central Electric Cooperative
 Oklahoma Gas & Electric
 Public Service Company of Oklahoma (part of American Electric Power)
 Western Farmers Electric Cooperative

Oregon
 Columbia River Public Utility District
 Coos-Curry Electric Coop
Eugene Water & Electric Board (EWEB)
 PacifiCorp (Pacific Power)
 Portland General Electric
West Oregon Electric Cooperative

Pennsylvania
 Adams Electric Cooperative
 Allegheny Electric Cooperative
 Bedford Rural Electric Cooperative
 Borough of Ephrata Electric Division
 Borough of Hatfield Electric Utility
 Borough of Kutztown Electric Department
 Borough of Quakertown Electric Department
 Borough of Schuylkill Haven Utilities Department
 Central Electric Cooperative
 Citizen's Electric Company
 Claverack Rural Electric Cooperative
 Direct Energy
 Duquesne Light 
 FirstEnergy (Met-Ed, Penelec, Penn Power, West Penn Power)
 Lansdale Electric
 New Enterprise Rural Electric Cooperative
 Northeast Utilities
 Northwestern Rural Electric Cooperative
 PECO, a subsidiary of Exelon
 Perkasie Borough Electric Department
 Pike County Light & Power
 PPL Corporation
 REA Energy Cooperative
 Rural Valley Electric Co.
 Somerset Rural Electric Cooperative
 Sullivan County Rural Electric Cooperative
 Tri-County Rural Electric Cooperative
 UGI Utilities
 United Electric Cooperative
 Valley Rural Electric Cooperative
 Warren Electric Cooperative
 Wellsboro Electric Company

Puerto Rico
 Puerto Rico Electric Power Authority
 EcoEléctrica

Rhode Island

Direct Energy
National Grid (Narragansett Electric)
Northeast Utilities
 Pascoag Utility District

South Carolina
Aiken Electric Co-Op
Berkeley Electric Co-Op
 Black River Electric Co-op
Blue Ridge Electric Co-op
Broad River Electric Co-op
Central Electric Power Cooperative, Inc.
Coastal Electric Co-op
Duke Energy 
Edisto Electric Co-op
Fairfield Electric Co-op
Horry Electric Co-op
Laurens Electric Co-op
Little River Electric Co-op
Lynches River Electric Co-op
Mid-Carolina Electric Co-op 
Newberry Electric Co-op
Palmetto Electric Co-op
Progress Energy Carolinas
 Santee Cooper
Santee Electric Co-op
 Dominion Energy
 Tri-County Electric Co-Op
York Electric Co-op

South Dakota
 Black Hills Power
East River Electric Cooperative
 MidAmerican Energy Company
 Montana-Dakota Utilities (MDU)
 Northern States Power Company, a subsidiary of Xcel Energy
Northwestern Energy
 Otter Tail Power Company
Rushmore Electric Cooperative
Xcel Energy

Tennessee
 Appalachian Power, a unit of American Electric Power
Chickasaw Electric Cooperative
 Citizens Utilities Board
 EPB (Electric Power Board), Chattanooga, Hamilton County
 Knoxville Utilities Board
 Lenoir City Utilities Board
 Memphis Light, Gas and Water
 Middle Tennessee Electric, Electric Cooperative
 Nashville Electric Service, metro Nashville, Davidson County
 Tennessee Valley Authority

Texas
 Austin Energy
 American Electric Power
 Amigo Energy
 South West Energy
 Bartlett Electric Cooperative
 Brazos Electric Power Cooperative
 CenterPoint Energy
 City of Bryan
 City of Greenville
 Comanche Electric Cooperative
 CoServ Electric
Cosery Electric
 CPS Energy
 Denton Municipal Electric
Duke energy
Direct Energy
dPi Energy
 El Paso Electric
Electric Database Publishing
Entergy
 Entrust Energy
 First Texas Energy Corporation
 Fort Belknap Electric Cooperative
 Garland Power & Light
 GDF SUEZ Energy Resources
 Golden Spread Electric Cooperative
 Hudson Energy
 Hamilton County Electric Cooperative
 Heart of Texas Electric Cooperative
 HILCO Electric Cooperative
 J-A-C Electric Cooperative
 Lower Colorado River Authority
 Luminant
 MidSouth Synergy
 Navarro County Electric Cooperative
 Navasota Valley Electric Cooperative
 Oncor Electric Delivery (Formerly TXU)
 Pedernales Electric Cooperative
 PenTex Energy
Rayburn Electric Cooperative
Reliant Energy
 South Plains Electric Cooperative
 Southwestern Public Service Company, a subsidiary of Xcel Energy
Texas Electric Service Company
 Texas New Mexico Power
 Tara Energy
 Tri-County Electric Cooperative
 TXU Energy
 United Cooperative Services
 Wise Electric Cooperative

Utah
 City of Bountiful
 IPA
 City of Kaysville
 PacifiCorp (Rocky Mountain Power)
 pacificorp (Dominion Energy)

Vermont
 Burlington Electric Department
 Green Mountain Power
 Vermont Electric Cooperative
 Washington Electric Cooperative

Virginia
 A&N Electric Cooperative
 Appalachian Power, a subsidiary of American Electric Power
 BARC Electric Cooperative
 Community Electric Cooperative
 Craig-Botetourt Electric Cooperative
 Danville Utilities
 Dominion Virginia Power
 Mecklenburg Electric Cooperative
 Northern Neck Electric Cooperative
 Northern Virginia Electric Cooperative
 Old Dominion Electric Cooperative
 Prince George Electric Cooperative
 Rapahannock Electric Cooperative
 Shenandoah Valley Electric Cooperative
 Southside Electric Cooperative

Washington
 Avista Utilities
 Benton County Public Utility District
 Big Bend Electric
 Chelan County Public Utility District
 City of Milton
 Clark Public Utilities
 Clearwater Power
 Columbia Rural Electric
 Douglas County Public Utility District
 Elmurst Mutual
 Franklin County Public Utility District
 Grant County Public Utility District
Klickitat Public Utility District
Lakeview Light & Power
Mason County Public Utility District 3
Modern Electric Water
Nespelem Valley Electric
Ohop Mutual
Okanaogan Country Electric & Propane
Orcas Power and Light Coop (OPALCO)
Parkland Light & Water
 PacifiCorp (Pacific Power)
 Peninsula Light Co
Pend Oreille County Public Utility District
 Puget Sound Energy
 Seattle City Light
 Snohomish County Public Utility District
 Tacoma Power
 Tanner Electric Coop
 Town of Stelacoom
 Town of Eatonville

West Virginia
 American Electric Power (Appalachian Power, Wheeling Electric Power)
 FirstEnergy (Mon Power, Potomac Edison)
 Black Diamond Power Company

Wisconsin
 Dairyland Power Cooperative (and its 25 member cooperatives)
 Madison Gas and Electric
 Northern States Power Company-Wisconsin, a subsidiary of Xcel Energy
 We Energies
 Wisconsin Power and Light Company, a part of Alliant Energy
 Wisconsin Public Service Corporation

Wyoming
 Cheyenne Light, Fuel & Power
Lower Valley Energy
Bridger Valley
Niobrara Electric
Black Hills Power 
Powder River Energy Corporation (A cooperative of Touchstone Energy)
Carbon Power & Light (A cooperative of Touchstone Energy)
 PacifiCorp (Rocky Mountain Power)
Tri-State Generation and Transmission Association (A cooperative of Touchstone Energy)
Western Area Power Administration

See also
Electricity distribution companies by country
List of Canadian electric utilities 
List of public utilities

References

Electricity

Lists of energy companies
Electric power-related lists